The 1993 Maryland Terrapins football team represented the University of Maryland in the 1993 NCAA Division I-A football season. In their second season under head coach Mark Duffner, the Terrapins compiled a 2–9 record, finished in a tie for seventh place in the Atlantic Coast Conference, and were outscored by their opponents 479 to 243. The team's statistical leaders included Scott Milanovich with 3,499 passing yards, Mark Mason with 606 rushing yards, and Jermaine Lewis with 957 receiving yards.

Schedule

Roster

References

Maryland
Maryland Terrapins football seasons
Maryland Terrapins football